The 1991 Arizona Wildcats football team represented the University of Arizona in the Pacific-10 Conference (Pac-10) during the 1991 NCAA Division I-A football season.  In their fifth season under head coach Dick Tomey, the Wildcats compiled a 4–7 record (3–5 against Pac-10 opponents), finished in a tie for sixth place in the Pac-10, and were outscored by their opponents, 361 to 248.  The team played its home games in Arizona Stadium in Tucson, Arizona.

The team's statistical leaders included George Malauulu with 674 passing yards, Billy Johnson with 682 rushing yards, and Chuck Levy with 289 receiving yards. Safety Tony Bouie led the team with 86 tackles.

Arizona’s season was mostly affected by a difficult schedule, along with injuries on the offense and inexperienced freshmen, as most of the starters from the 1990 team graduated. Also, the Wildcats lost to rival Arizona State for the first time in the Tomey era.

Schedule

Game summaries

Ohio State
Arizona began the season on the road against Ohio State. It was only the second meeting between the Wildcats and Buckeyes, with the first one occurring in 1967, when Arizona upset legendary Ohio State coach Woody Hayes and the Buckeyes. This time, the Buckeyes came out and dominated a rebuilding Wildcat squad (the head coach of Ohio State was John Cooper, who went 0–2–1 against the Wildcats as Arizona State coach from 1985 to 1987 prior to being hired by the Buckeyes).

Washington
In Arizona’s second consecutive visit to Washington, the Wildcats would end up getting humiliated by the Huskies, who then went on to share the national championship.

Miami (FL)
The Wildcats hosted second-ranked Miami in a rare October non-conference game. The Hurricanes would outplay an inexperienced Arizona team on its way to a dominant win. The Wildcats’ offense was riddled with injuries and used mostly reserved players as starters, whose lack of experience was a factor in the loss.

Due to Miami being favored to win big and the game unlikely to be competitive, as well as a late game kickoff, cable and national networks turned down the offer to air the game, which led to it being picked up by local broadcasters in the Miami and Tucson markets.

USC
In their home finale, the Wildcats hosted USC. Arizona came out hot on both sides of the ball and easily defeated the Trojans. It was the Wildcats’ first home win over USC in their history, as their other wins against the Trojans came on the road. The USC coach, Larry Smith (the previous Arizona coach at the time), lost in Tucson as the opposing coach for the first time.

Arizona State

The Wildcats visited Tempe for the season finale against Arizona State. Arizona would play poorly all night and ASU scored enough to finally ended the Wildcats’ streak of dominance in the rivalry. It was ASU’s first win over Arizona since 1981 (despite a tie in 1987).

A positive moment for the Wildcats occurred late in the game, when they blocked an ASU punt and returned it for a touchdown, which gave them some points. Arizona ended the season with four wins, which snapped a three-year streak of winning records.

Season notes
 The season was declared a rebuilding one, according to Tomey. That, as well as a tough schedule (which included four games against ranked opponents) and a young offense, all of which led to the Wildcats’ 4–7 record.
 Due to former Arizona offensive coordinator Rip Scherer taking the head coaching position at James Madison after the 1990 season, Tomey became the offensive coordinator in addition to being the head coach (Tomey was also the offensive coordinator in his first season in 1987). Arizona’s offense struggled at times during this season without Scherer in charge, and led to the team’s 4–7 record.
 Two of Arizona’s wins (against Long Beach State and Oregon State) had identical final scores (45–21).
 The three-game losing streak that the Wildcats suffered in the middle of the season (blowout losses to UCLA, Washington, and Miami) essentially sealed their season’s fate and ended all chances of a bowl game.
 Arizona defeated USC for the second consecutive season, as they won in 1990. The Wildcats would only repeat this only once since then (1999–2000, in Tomey’s final years as coach). Also, this season would be the last time in which Tomey would defeat his predecessor.
 The Wildcats four wins were the lowest since 1987, which was Tomey’s first year when Arizona also won four games.
 After losing to Arizona State, the Wildcats would continue their dominance over them for the rest of the decade until Tomey left in 2000.
 Although the defense played below-average this season, they would improve and become dominant in 1992 and would become the nation’s best through the early part of the 1990s.

References

Arizona
Arizona Wildcats football seasons
Arizona Wildcats football